Min Qiu from the Zhejiang University, Zhejiang, China, was named Fellow of the Institute of Electrical and Electronics Engineers (IEEE) in 2016 for contributions to nanophotonic devices.

References

Fellow Members of the IEEE
Living people
Year of birth missing (living people)
Place of birth missing (living people)
Academic staff of Zhejiang University